Orange Grove, also known as the Gaillard-Colclough House, is an historic  plantation and its plantation house at Gaillard's Crossroads, (intersection of Peach Orchard Road and Black River Road), north of Dalzell, South Carolina. It was added to the National Register of Historic Places on August 19, 1993.

Originally built in 1851 in a South Carolina Lowcountry vernacular style of architecture, the house was seriously damaged by a tornado on April 30, 1924, and was rebuilt so that it now appears as a "raised cottage with a Prairie or Craftsman roof."

The plantation house's main axis runs NW-SE, with the façade on the SE face.

References

Houses on the National Register of Historic Places in South Carolina
Houses completed in 1851
Houses in Sumter County, South Carolina
Plantations in South Carolina
Plantation houses in South Carolina
Antebellum architecture
National Register of Historic Places in Sumter County, South Carolina
1851 establishments in South Carolina